Farfalle are a type of pasta commonly known as bow-tie pasta or butterfly pasta. The name is derived from the Italian word farfalle (butterflies). In the Italian region of Emilia-Romagna, farfalle are known as strichetti (a local word for "bow ties").  A larger variation of farfalle is known as farfalloni, while the miniature version is called farfalline.  Farfalle date back to the 16th century in the Lombardy and Emilia-Romagna regions of Northern Italy.

Varieties
Farfalle come in several sizes, but they all have a distinctive "bow tie" shape. Usually, the farfalle are formed from a rectangle or oval of pasta, with two of the sides trimmed to a ruffled edge and the center pinched together to make the unusual shape of the pasta. A ridged version of the pasta is known as farfalle rigate. Though usable with most sauces, farfalle are best suited to cream and tomato sauces.

In addition to plain and whole-wheat varieties, colours are added by mixing certain ingredients into the dough, which also affects the flavor (as with any pasta). For example, beetroot can be used for red, spinach for green and cuttlefish ink for black. A tomato variety may also be available. Green, white, and red varieties are often sold together in a mix that recalls the colors of the flag of Italy.

See also
 List of pasta
 Cimcik erişte

References

Types of pasta